Edith Kimani is a Kenyan media personality and journalist. She works at German international broadcasting service Deutsche Welle (DW) as a news anchor and reporter. She was previously the East African Correspondent reporting on environmental issues and she hosted the DW's show called Eco@Africa. She currently hosts a youth show called The 77 percent.

Early life and education
Kimani was born and raised in Kinoo, Kiambu. She later went to Forest View Academy in Karen for her primary school before moving to Westlands primary school at class four where she did her Kenya Certificate of Primary Education, and later went to high school at State House Girls School in Nairobi. While at State House Girls secondary school, she excelled in acting and drama and was offered a scholarship to join Hillcrest International School, where she did her Kenya Certificate of Secondary Education (KCSE). She later joined United States International University, where she studied International relations.

At the age of 19, she participated in a talent search show for aspiring journalists called The Presenter that was airing on Kenya Television Network (KTN). She won the competition and was hired as a reporter and anchor at the TV station owned by Standard Group PLC. She worked there for seven years before resigning to become an East African Correspondent at the German station Deutsche Welle. She was later promoted to become a news anchor and hosts a youth show called The 77 percent.

Kimani hosted DW's Global Media Forum in June 2019 as well as at the 2019 World Economic Forum on Africa in South Africa. She also moderated a discussion session at the World Trade Organization's Public Forum in Switzerland.

References

Kenyan journalists
Kenyan women journalists
Kenyan television journalists
Kenyan women television journalists
Living people
People from Kiambu County
Year of birth missing (living people)